Marmylaris is a genus of longhorn beetles of the subfamily Lamiinae, containing the following species:

 Marmylaris buckleyi (Pascoe, 1857)
 Marmylaris truncatipennis Breuning, 1940

References

Pteropliini